The museum of fine arts and archeology of Dole was founded in 1821.  Since 1980, the museum is installed in the House of the Officers, an example of military architecture of Franche-Comté at the 18th century.

Collections 

The collections comprise three sections:  archeology, ancient art and contemporary art.

Archeology:  It is a matter of the archeological discoveries in the area of Jura, from the Neolithic to the Merovingian era.

Ancient art:
 Burgundian and of Franche-Comté sculptures from the Middle Age to the 18th century (G. Lullier, F.-M. Rosset, C.-F. Attiret),
 French paintings 17th century and 18th century  (S. Vouet, E. Allegrain, Ch.-A. Coypel), Italian Old Master Giambattista Pittoni, Italian ones (F. Albani, L. Giordano, G. Assereto) and Nordic ones (Maître de Saint-Gilles, P. van Boucle, C. Gysbrechts).
 Paintings from the 19th century (J. B. Jongkind, G. Courbet), in particular from local artistes (J.-D. Attiret, A. Pointelin, J. Machard, G. Brun).
 The History of Franche-Comté is represented by conquest scenes painted by van der Meulen, Martin des Batailles and Martin des Gobelins.
 
Contemporary art: 
 Paintings of artists who worked in France since the 60’ having for theme art and corporation: the Narrative Figuration (Fromanger, Rancillac, Monory, Erró) and the New Realism (Arman, Villeglé, Deschamps).
 Temporary expositions:
 1985: Claude-Max Lochu, Erró
 1987: Yayoi Kusama
 1991: Charlemagne Palestine
 1994: Peter Stampfli
 1997: Yan Pei-Ming
 1999: Jacques Monory
 2000: Peter Saul
 2003: Bernard Rancillac
 2004: Gérard Deschamps
 2005: Gérard Fromanger
 2006: Helen Frik: The Frik Collection
 2006: La Figuration Narrative
 2007: La sculpture du XVe siècle en Franche-Comté
 2008: Swetlana Heger
 2009: Jean-Olivier Hucleux
 2010: Erró. 50 ans de collages
 2011: Ida Tursic et Wilfried Mille
 2012: Laurent Pécheux
 2013: Philippe Cognée
 2013: Gérard Schlosser

External links
Musée des Beaux-Arts de Dole
 Musée des Beaux-Arts de Dole sur le site des Musées de Franche-Comté

Dole
Dole
Dole
Buildings and structures in Jura (department)
Museums in Jura (department)
Art museums established in 1821
1821 establishments in France